is a Japanese voice actress who works for Aksent. On February 24, 2014, she announced that she had been married around December 2013.

Filmography

2002
Seven of Seven - Erino Kogarashi
Princess Tutu - Malen and Uzura
2004
SD Gundam Force - Core
2005
Aria the Animation - Akari Mizunashi
2006
Aria the Natural - Akari Mizunashi
Kiba - Aisha, Elmeyda, Frea, Jure, Mia
Tonagura! - Marie Kagura
2007
Aria the OVA ~Arietta~ - Akari Mizunashi
Blue Dragon - Kluke
Darker than Black - Mayuko (episode 13)
Night Wizard the Animation - Longinus (episode 7)
2008
Aria the Origination - Akari Mizunashi
2009
Maria Holic - Maki Natsuru
Akaneiro ni Somaru Saka - Mikoto Tachibana
Kyo no Gononi - Haruka Tanaka
2010
Hanamaru Kindergarten - Nanako Yamamoto
Uragiri wa Boku no Namae wo Shitteiru - Shiori Yoshino

References

External links
 Official agency profile 
 
 

Living people
Japanese video game actresses
Japanese voice actresses
Voice actresses from Tokyo
Year of birth missing (living people)